The Japanese destroyer {{nihongo|Fuji|藤|}} was one of 21 s built for the Imperial Japanese Navy (IJN) in the late 1910s. She was converted into a patrol boat in 1940 and was surrendered to the Netherlands in July 1946 at Surabaya; she was finally scrapped on August 10, 1946.

Design and description
The Momi class was designed with higher speed and better seakeeping than the preceding  second-class destroyers. Fuji was powered by two Parsons geared steam turbines, each driving one propeller shaft using steam provided by three Kampon water-tube boilers. Their crew consisted of 110 officers and crewmen.

The main armament of the Momi-class ships consisted of three  Type 3 guns in single mounts; one gun forward of the well deck, one between the two funnels, and the last gun atop the aft superstructure. The guns were numbered '1' to '3' from front to rear. The ships carried two above-water twin sets of  torpedo tubes; one mount was in the well deck between the forward superstructure and the bow gun and the other between the aft funnel and aft superstructure.

In 1940, Fuji was converted into a patrol boat. Her torpedo tubes, minesweeping gear, and aft 12 cm gun were removed in exchange for two triple mounts for license-built  Type 96 light AA guns and 60 depth charges.

Construction and career
Fuji, built at the Fujinagata Shipyards in Osaka, was laid down on December 6, 1919, launched on November 27th, 1920 and completed on May 31, 1921. During 1940, she was converted into a patrol boat and was renamed Patrol Boat No. 36 on April 1. The ship was surrendered to the Netherlands in Surabaya at the end of the war. Patrol Boat No. 36 was scrapped on August 10, 1946.

Notes

References

1920 ships
Ships built by Fujinagata Shipyards
Momi-class destroyers